Cubic lattice  may refer to:
Cubic crystal system
Cubic honeycomb vertex arrangement
Integer lattice Z3